The 1928 Central State Bearcats football team represented Central State Teachers College, later renamed Central Michigan University, in the Michigan Collegiate Conference (MCC) during the 1928 college football season. In their sixth and final season under head coach Wallace Parker, the Bearcats compiled a 6–3 record (1–2 against MCC opponents) and outscored their opponents by a combined total of 126 to 73. The team lost to its in-state rivals Michigan State Normal (0–36) and Western State Teachers (0–19).

Wallace Parker left the team after the 1928 season.  In six years as head coach, he compiled a 32-10-6 record.

Schedule

References

Central State
Central Michigan Chippewas football seasons
Central State Bearcats football